One Centenary Square (formerly Two Arena Central), is a , eleven storey building between Alpha Tower and the former Birmingham Municipal Bank headquarters on Broad Street in Birmingham, England. The building serves HSBC Bank as their UK headquarters for the personal and business banking operations.

HSBC

In 2015 HSBC Bank completed the deal to forward purchase the building on a 250-year lease which will house UK business and personal banking services with up to 1,000 staff. The deal is the largest property deal in Birmingham since 2002.

History of the site

The development of the site started when the Birmingham Canal was cut in 1768–72. Its terminal basin, named Old Wharf, was located at the rear of the proposed building. The site was occupied by the Eagle Iron Foundry during the 19th century up until 1926 when it was cleared and replaced by the Masonic Hall. The building formed the southern part of the Civic Centre masterplan with the Municipal Bank built in 1933 to its west. The Freemasons occupied the hall until 1939 when it was acquired by the government during World War II to be used by the Ministry of Food and the War Office for Army Recruitment. The hall was later adapted in the 1970s to form part of the ATV studio complex. The hall was demolished in 2006 ahead of the proposed Arena Central development project.

Construction

On 7 September 2015, representatives from Miller Developments undertook a groundbreaking ceremony to signal the start of the construction phase. Works were complete in autumn 2018.

See also
 HSBC lions

Notes

Proposed buildings and structures in Birmingham, West Midlands
Centenary Square, Birmingham
HSBC
HSBC buildings and structures